The 73rd Assembly District of Wisconsin is one of 99 districts in the Wisconsin State Assembly.  Located in the northwest corner of Wisconsin, the district comprises all of Burnett County, as well as western and northern Douglas County and most of the northern half of Washburn County.  It includes the city and village of Superior and the villages of Grantsburg, Lake Nebagamon, Minong, Poplar, Siren, and Webster.  It also contains the University of Wisconsin–Superior campus, Amnicon Falls State Park, Pattison State Park, and much of the Saint Croix National Scenic Riverway.  The district is represented by Republican Angie Sapik, since January 2023.

The 73rd Assembly district is located within Wisconsin's 25th Senate district, along with the 74th and 75th Assembly districts.

Politically, the 73rd Assembly district is unique as one of the few remaining competitive seats in Wisconsin's heavily gerrymandered legislative map.

List of past representatives

References 

Wisconsin State Assembly districts
Burnett County, Wisconsin
Douglas County, Wisconsin
Washburn County, Wisconsin